Eva Speck is a retired Swiss slalom canoeist who competed in the early 1950s. She won a bronze medal in the folding K-1 team event at the 1951 ICF Canoe Slalom World Championships in Steyr.

References

Swiss female canoeists
Possibly living people
Year of birth missing
Medalists at the ICF Canoe Slalom World Championships